"Dirthouse" is a song by heavy metal band Static-X. It is the fifth track and second single from their album Start a War. The video released in November 2005, features band playing at a rather dirty place, which is easily noticeable on drums which are all covered with ash. As the video progresses the loudness of the music causes dirt to fall from the light fixtures and ceiling. By the end of the video a thick layer of dirt is evident on the floor.

Chart performance

References

2005 singles
Static-X songs
2005 songs
Warner Records singles
Songs written by Tripp Eisen
Songs written by Tony Campos
Songs written by Wayne Static